Annabel Morris Buchanan (October 22, 1888January 6, 1983) was an American composer and folklorist. The author of the book Folk Hymns of America (1938) as well as myriad journal articles, Buchanan (along with John Powell) helped found the White Top Folk Festival (hosted in Grayson County, Virginia from 1931 to 1939), which promoted music of the people in the Appalachian Mountains. Buchanan's documenting practices are credited for preserving many folk songs that might have otherwise gone on unrecorded.

Biography
Annabel Buchanan was born Annie Bell Morris on October 22, 1888 in Groesbeck, Texas. Her father, William Caruthers Morris, worked for a local newspaper before becoming a minister in the Presbyterian Church; her mother, Anna Virginia Foster Morris, was a teacher. In 1901, Annabel moved with her family to Maury County, Tennessee. In 1906, she graduated with honors from the Landon Conservatory in Dallas; it was at this time that she took the name Annabel. She went on to teach music at Halsell College in Vinita, Oklahoma (1907–08) and the Stonewall Jackson Institute in Abingdon, Virginia (1909–12). In 1912, Annabel married John Preston Buchanan, a lawyer who would eventually serve as a member of the Virginia Senate, representing the state's 1st district.

In 2018 the Virginia Capitol Foundation announced that Buchanan's name would be on the Virginia Women's Monument's glass Wall of Honor.

References

External links
 Annabel Morris Buchanan Papers, 1902-1972  the official repository of Annabel Morris Buchanan's papers, housed by University of North Carolina Libraries

1888 births
1983 deaths
American composers
American women composers